Events from the year 1665 in England.

Incumbents
 Monarch – Charles II
 Parliament – Cavalier

Events
 4 March – beginning of the Second Anglo-Dutch War.
 6 March – the Philosophical Transactions of the Royal Society of London begins publication, the first scientific journal in English and the oldest to be continuously published.
 7 March – HMS London accidentally explodes in the Thames Estuary killing 300 with only 24 survivors.
 March – 15-year-old Nell Gwyn makes her first definitely recorded appearance as an actress on the London stage, in John Dryden's heroic drama The Indian Emperour, having previously been a theatre orange-seller.
 12 April – the first recorded victim of the Great Plague of London dies. Over the summer it is thought to have spread as far as Derby and on 6 September the first plague death takes place in the Derbyshire village of Eyam.
 19 May – Great Fire of Newport, Shropshire.
 3 June (13 June N.S.) – Second Anglo-Dutch War: English naval victory at the Battle of Lowestoft.
 12 June – the city of New Amsterdam in the Province of New York is reincorporated as New York, named after James, Duke of York, and the first Mayor appointed.
 7 July – the King and court leave London to avoid the plague, moving first to Salisbury, then (from 25 September) Oxford.
 2 August – Second Anglo-Dutch War: Dutch naval victory at the Battle of Vågen off Norway.
 21 September – consecration of new chapel at Pembroke College, Cambridge, Christopher Wren's first completed work of architecture.
 9 October – the Cavalier Parliament assembles in Oxford to avoid the Plague in London.
 31 October – Parliament passes the Five Mile Act preventing non-conformist ministers from coming within five miles of incorporated towns or the place of their former livings.
 7 November – The London Gazette begins publication as The Oxford Gazette.
 Great Fire of Rolvenden, Kent.
 Royal Navy Dockyard established at Sheerness for storage and refitting.

Publications
 John Bunyan's The Resurrection.
 Richard Head's The English Rogue.
 Robert Hooke's Micrographia.

Births
 6 February – Anne, Queen of Great Britain (died 1714)
 March – Sir William Strickland, 3rd Baronet, Member of Parliament (died 1724)
 1 May – John Woodward, naturalist (died 1728)
 27 August – John Hervey, 1st Earl of Bristol, politician (died 1751)
 September – Sir Thomas Frankland, 2nd Baronet, Member of Parliament (died 1726)
 5 November – Sir William Brownlow, 4th Baronet, Member of Parliament (died 1701)
 28 December – George FitzRoy, 1st Duke of Northumberland, general, illegitimate son of Charles II (died 1716)
 William Cowper, 1st Earl Cowper, Lord Chancellor (died 1723)
 Charles Gildon, writer (died 1724)
 Benjamin Johnson, actor (died 1742)

Deaths
 9 March – Thomas Wentworth, 5th Baron Wentworth, soldier and politician (born 1612)
 3 June – Charles Weston, 3rd Earl of Portland (born 1639)
 18 July (bur.) – Elizabeth Stanhope, Countess of Chesterfield (born 1640)
 11 July – Kenelm Digby, privateer (born 1603)
 25 August – Charles Seymour, 2nd Baron Seymour of Trowbridge (born c. 1621)
 17 November – John Earle, bishop (born c. 1601)
 19 November (bur.) – Elizabeth Cromwell, Lady Protectress (born 1598)
 Walter Acton, Member of Parliament (born c. 1620)

References

 
Years of the 17th century in England